Colloquially, room temperature is a range of air temperatures that most people prefer for indoor settings. It feels comfortable to a person when they are wearing typical indoor clothing. Human comfort can extend beyond this range depending on humidity, air circulation and other factors. Food or beverages may be served at room temperature, meaning neither heated nor cooled.

In certain fields, like science and engineering, and within a particular context, room temperature can mean different agreed-upon ranges. In contrast, ambient temperature is the actual temperature, as measured by a thermometer, of the air (or other medium and surroundings) in any particular place. The ambient temperature (e.g. an unheated room in winter) may be very different from an ideal room temperature.

Comfort temperatures

Some studies have suggested that thermal comfort preferences of men and women may differ significantly, with women on average preferring higher ambient temperatures.

Health effects

For infants, elderly, and those with significant health problems, a minimum  was recommended.

The recommendation regarding risk of exposure to high indoor temperatures is only "conditional".

Definitions in science and industry
Temperature ranges are defined as room temperature for certain products and processes in industry, science, and consumer goods.

See also
 Standard conditions for temperature and pressure
 
Indoor air quality

References

Environmental engineering
Heating, ventilation, and air conditioning
Science experiments
Atmospheric temperature